Arla is a genus of moths in the family Gelechiidae.

Species
The genus contains the following species:

Arla diversella (Busck, 1916)
Arla tenuicornis Clarke, 1942

References

Gelechiini
Moth genera